Anthocharis stella browningi, the Utah Stella orangetip, is a subspecies of the Stella orangetip mainly found in the southern American Rocky Mountains especially in the drier areas.

References 

Anthocharis
Butterfly subspecies